Kyle Newacheck (born January 23, 1984) is an American television writer, director, producer and actor. He is one of the creators of the Comedy Central show Workaholics, in which he also co-starred. He is a producer and director on the FX comedy horror series What We Do in the Shadows.

Life and career 

Originally from Concord, California, Newacheck graduated from The Los Angeles Film School in 2004 with a degree in editing. He worked as an editing teacher at his alma mater before forming the sketch comedy group, Mail Order Comedy with Blake Anderson, Adam DeVine and Anders Holm in 2006.

Newacheck began writing, directing and editing comedy short films with Mail Order Comedy, most notably the "Crossbows and Moustaches" web series for Myspace. In 2011, Newacheck co-created Workaholics, a Comedy Central series which aired for seven seasons, which revolves around three slackers and their drug dealer. Newacheck co-stars in the series as the drug dealer Karl Hevacheck.

Newacheck also directed approximately half of the Workaholics episodes. He has since become a television comedy director, directing episodes of Community, Parks and Recreation, Happy Endings and others. He is currently set to direct an untitled TV movie written by Greg Daniels and Robert Padnick.

Newacheck also collaborated with Mail Order Comedy partner DeVine for his show Adam DeVine's House Party. Newacheck is the co-creator, director, and occasional star.

He directed the music video for Childish Gambino's "The Worst Guys" in 2014 alongside his brother, Adam.

In June 2016 it was announced that Devine, Anderson, Holm and Newacheck were working on a film with Seth Rogen as producer. The film, Game Over, Man!, debuted on Netflix in 2018.

Since 2019, he has been a co-executive producer and director on the FX series What We Do in the Shadows.

Filmography
 2011–2017: Workaholics (41 episodes)
 2012: Community (2 episodes)
 2012: Parks and Recreation (1 episode)
 2012–2013: Happy Endings (3 episodes)
 2013: Adam DeVine's House Party (8 episodes)
 2016: Idiotsitter (1 episode)
 2017: Ghosted (1 episode)
 2018: Game Over, Man!
 2019: Murder Mystery
 2020-2021: What We Do in the Shadows (9 episodes)
 2022: I'm Totally Fine

Awards and nominations

References

External links 
 Official website of Wonk Inc
 Official website of Mail Order Comedy

1984 births
Living people
American male television actors
American television directors
American television writers
Comedy film directors
American male television writers
Los Angeles Film School alumni